Martin Zawieja (born 31 January 1963) is a retired West German weightlifter who was active between 1985 and 1992. He competed at the 1988 and 1992 Summer Olympics in the super heavyweight category and finished in third and ninth place, respectively. He finished third in the snatch at the 1991 World Weightlifting Championships and won three national titles in 1984, 1990 and 1991.

After retiring from competitions he studied physical education, graduating in 1995, and later worked as a weightlifting coach. He was the head coach of the national junior (2001–2006) and women's teams (2002–2005).

References

1963 births
Living people
German male weightlifters
Sportspeople from Dortmund
Olympic weightlifters of West Germany
Olympic weightlifters of Germany
Weightlifters at the 1988 Summer Olympics
Weightlifters at the 1992 Summer Olympics
Olympic bronze medalists for West Germany
Olympic medalists in weightlifting
Medalists at the 1988 Summer Olympics
20th-century German people
21st-century German people